Zhuang may refer to:

Zhuang people (or Bouxcuengh people), ethnic group in China
Zhuang languages
Zhuang logogram
Zhuang Zhou, ancient Chinese philosopher
Zhuang (surname) (庄/莊), a Chinese surname

Language and nationality disambiguation pages